State Nuclear Power Safety Inspectorate (VATESI) is the state regulator for nuclear energy in the Republic of Lithuania. It is also responsible for safety in use of ionising radiation in this area.

Heads 
 Genadijus Lipunovas – 1991–1992 
 Povilas Vaišnys – 1992–1997 m
 Saulius Kutas – 1997–2006 
 Kazys Žilys – 2006 
 Gytis Maksimovas – 2006–2009 
 In 2012 Michail Demčenko was appointed to the position of VATESI Head.

References 
 VATESI today

External links 
 Official website 
 Ignalina Nuclear Power Plant 
 Radioactive Waste Management Agency

See also 
 Nuclear power
 Nuclear safety and security
 Radiation safety
 Physical security

Nuclear safety and security
Radiation protection organizations